Jin Ying is a Chinese Sanda kickboxer, who has throughout his career fought almost exclusively with Wu Lin Feng. He was the 2020 WLF King's Cup Runner-up.

As of 1 August 2020, he is ranked the #7 bantamweight in the world by Combat Press. As of January 2022, Beyond Kick has him ranked as the fifth best kickboxer in the world in the 64kg division.

Kickboxing career
Ying began 2019 with a decision win over Promdonyang Wirat, and followed it up with a unanimous decision win against Nicolas Gaffie, before losing a decision in turn to Markko Moisar. He then entered the 2019 WLF 63 kg tournament. He defeated Anas Mouktader by decision in the quarterfinals, but lost to the eventual winner Denis Wosik by decision in the semifinals.

In 2020, Ying fought four times. In the WLF King's Cup First Stage, Ying won a unanimous decision against Zhu Shuai. In the second stage he defeated Zhao Chongyang by a first round TKO, and in the third stage he won a decision against Fang Feida. This set up the final bout for the 2020 King's Cup against the two time WLF champion Wei Rui. Rui won their fight by unanimous decision.

Titles and achievements
Amateur
 2010 World Martial Arts Exchange Conference Sanda -58 kg Champion
 2011 World Martial Arts Exchange Conference Sanda -58 kg Champion
 2013 China National Boxing Junior Championship 63.5 kg Champion

Professional
Wu Lin Feng
 2015 Wu Lin Feng -60 kg Newcomer of the Year
 2020 Wu Lin Feng King's Super Cup Runner-Up

Kickboxing record

|-  style="background:#fbb;"
| 2022-12-09 || Loss || align=left| Zhu Shuai  || Wu Lin Feng 532, Tournament Final  || Zhengzhou, China || Decision (Unanimous)|| 3 ||3:00
|-  style="background:#cfc;"
| 2022-12-09 ||Win|| align=left| Zhang Jun || Wu Lin Feng 532, Tournament Semi Final  || Zhengzhou, China || Decision || 3 ||3:00

|-  style="background:#cfc;"
| 2022-09-24 || Win || align=left| Ma Yunkang ||  Wu Lin Feng 531|| Zhengzhou, China || Decision (Unanimous)|| 3 ||3:00

|-  style="background:#cfc;"
| 2022-03-26 || Win || align=left| San Shun|| Wu Lin Feng 528, Final || Zhengzhou, China || Decision (Unanimous) ||3 ||3:00
|-  style="background:#cfc;"
| 2022-03-26 || Win || align=left| Liu Wei|| Wu Lin Feng 528, Semi Final || Zhengzhou, China || Decision (Unanimous) ||3 ||3:00
|-  style="background:#cfc;"
| 2022-01-01 || Win || align=left| Wei Weiyang || Wu Lin Feng 2022, Contender League Final || Tangshan, China || Decision (Unanimous) || 3 ||3:00
|-  style="background:#cfc;"
| 2021-11-27 ||Win || align=left| Zhu Shuai || Wu Lin Feng 2021: World Contender League 7th Stage Contender League Semi Final || Zhengzhou, China || Ext.R Decision (Split) || 4 ||3:00
|-  style="background:#fbb;"
| 2021-09-30 || Loss || align=left| Zheng Junfeng || Wu Lin Feng 2021: World Contender League 6th Stage || Zhengzhou, China || Decision (Unanimous) || 3 ||3:00 
|-  style="background:#cfc;"
| 2021-05-22 || Win || align=left| Yuan Pengbin || Wu Lin Feng 2021: World Contender League 3rd Stage || Xin County, China || Decision (Unanimous) ||3 ||3:00
|-  style="background:#cfc;"
| 2021-03-27 || Win || align=left| Shun Li || Wu Lin Feng 2021: World Contender League 1st Stage || China || Decision (Unanimous)|| 3||3:00
|-  style="background:#cfc;"
| 2021-01-23 || Win || align=left| Zhu Shuai || Wu Lin Feng 2021: Global Kung Fu Festival || Macao, China || Decision (Unanimous) || 3||3:00
|-  style="background:#fbb;"
| 2020-11-14|| Loss||align=left| Shun Li || Wu Lin Feng 2020: China 63kg Championship Tournament, Quarter Final  || Zhengzhou, China || Decision (Unanimous)|| 3 || 3:00
|-  style="background:#fbb;"
| 2020-10-18 || Loss || align=left| Wei Rui || Wu Lin Feng 2020: King's Super Cup Final || Zhengzhou, China || Decision (Unanimous) || 3 || 3:00  
|-  
! style=background:white colspan=9 |
|-  style="background:#cfc;"
| 2020-07-05 || Win || align=left| Fang Feida || Wu Lin Feng 2020: King's Super Cup 3rd Group Stage || Zhengzhou, China || Decision || 3 || 3:00
|-  style="background:#cfc;"
| 2020-06-13 || Win || align=left| Zhao Chongyang || Wu Lin Feng 2020: King's Super Cup 2nd Group Stage || Zhengzhou, China || TKO (Left Hook) || 1 || 1:48
|-
|-  style="background:#CCFFCC;"
| 2020-05-15 || Win ||align=left| Zhu Shuai || Wu Lin Feng 2020: King's Super Cup 1st Group Stage|| Zhengzhou, China || Decision (Unanimous) || 3 || 3:00
|- style="background:#cfc;"
| 2019-10-23 || Win||align=left| Marc Alcoba || Wu Lin Feng 2019: WLF in Manila|| Manila, Philippines || Decision || 3 || 3:00
|-  style="background:#fbb;"
| 2019-08-31||Loss||align=left| Fabrício Andrade || Wu Lin Feng 2019: WLF -67kg World Cup 2019-2020 3rd Group Stage || Zhengzhou, China || TKO (Doctor Stoppage) || 3 ||
|-  style="background:#fbb;"
| 2019-04-27||Loss||align=left| Denis Wosik || Wu Lin Feng 2019: WLF -63kg Championship World Tournament, Semi Finals || Zhuhai, China || Decision  ||3 ||3:00
|-  style="background:#cfc;"
| 2019-04-27||Win ||align=left| Anas Mouktader || Wu Lin Feng 2019: WLF -63kg Championship World Tournament, Quarter Finals || Zhuhai, China || Decision  ||3 ||3:00
|- style="background:#fbb;"
| 2019-04-13 || Loss ||align=left| Markko Moisar || Wu Lin Feng 2019: WLF China vs Estonia || Tallinn, Estonia || Decision || 3 || 3:00
|- style="background:#CCFFCC;"
| 2019-02-23|| Win ||align=left| Nicolas Gaffie || Wu Lin Feng 2019: WLF Championship in Zhengzhou || Zhengzhou, China || Decision (Unanimous) || 3 || 3:00
|-  style="background:#cfc;"
| 2019-01-19|| Win ||align=left| Promdonyang Wirat|| Wu Lin Feng 2019: WLF World Cup 2018-2019 Final|| Haikou, China || Decision (Unanimous)|| 3 || 3:00
|-  style="background:#cfc;"
| 2018-12-01|| Win ||align=left| Kazbek Alisultanov|| Wu Lin Feng 2018: WLF -67kg World Cup 2018-2019 6th Round  || Zhengzhou, China || Decision|| 3 || 3:00
|-  style="background:#cfc;"
| 2018-10-13|| Win ||align=left| Amro Al Falastini|| Wu Lin Feng 2018: China vs Canada|| Markham, Ontario Canada || Decision|| 3 || 3:00
|-  style="background:#fbb;"
| 2018-08-24|| Loss||align=left| Adrian Maxim || Wu Lin Feng 2018: WLF x OSS Fighters - China vs Romania || Mamaia, Romania || Decision (Unanimous) || 3 || 3:00
|-  style="background:#fbb;"
| 2018-07-22|| Loss||align=left| Hayato Suzuki || Krush.90 || Tokyo, Japan || Decision (Unanimous) || 3 || 3:00
|-  style="background:#cfc;"
| 2018-05-19|| Win ||align=left| Jonathan Tuhu || Wu Lin Feng 2018: World Championship Yichun || Yichun, China || Decision (Unanimous) || 3 || 3:00
|- style="background:#cfc;"
| 2018-04-07 || Win||align=left| Artur Sorsor || Wu Lin Feng 2018: World Championship Shijiazhuang|| Shijiazhuang, China || Decision || 3 || 3:00
|- style="background:#fbb;"
| 2018-03-03|| Loss||align=left| Denis Wosik || Wu Lin Feng 2018: World Championship Tianjin  || Tianjin, China || Decision  || 3 || 3:00
|-  style="background:#fbb;"
| 2018-02-03|| Loss||align=left| Nafi Bilalovski ||  Wu Lin Feng 2018: World Championship in Shenzhen || Shenzen, China || Decision  || 3 || 3:00
|- style="background:#cfc;"
| 2017-12-03 || Win||align=left| Najib Djelloudi || Wu Lin Feng 2017 || Zhengzhou, China || Decision (Unanimous)|| 3 || 3:00
|- style="background:#fbb;"
| 2017-11-18 || Loss||align=left| TJ Arcangel || Wu Lin Feng 2017: USA vs China	 || Las Vegas, United States || Decision (Unanimous)|| 3 || 3:00
|- style="background:#fbb;"
| 2017-11-04 || Loss||align=left| Adrian Maxim || Wu Lin Feng 2017: Yi Long VS Sitthichai || Kunming, China || Ext.R Decision  || 4 || 3:00
|- style="background:#cfc;"
| 2017-10-07 || Win||align=left| Rodion Sheremet || Wu Lin Feng 2017: WLF VS ACB & ACB KB 11 || Zhengzhou, China || Decision (Unanimous) || 3 || 3:00
|- style="background:#fbb;"
| 2017-08-05 || Loss ||align=left| Thanonchai Thanakorngym || Wu Lin Feng 2017: China VS Thailand || Zhengzhou, China || Decision || 3 || 3:00
|- style="background:#cfc;"
| 2017-07-01 || Win||align=left| Carlos Campos || Wu Lin Feng 2017: China VS Spain || Zhengzhou, China || TKO (Leg injury) || 2 ||
|- style="background:#cfc;"
| 2017-06-16 || Win||align=left| Jóni Máté || Wu Lin Feng 2017: Romania VS China || Timișoara, Romania || TKO (Corner Stoppage) || 3 || 2:32
|- style="background:#fbb;"
| 2017-06-03 || Loss ||align=left| Daizo Sasaki || Wu Lin Feng 2017: China VS Japan || Changsha, China || Decision (Split) || 3 || 3:00
|- style="background:#cfc;"
| 2017-05-06 || Win ||align=left| Samransak || Wu Lin Feng 2017: China VS USA || Zhengzhou, China || Decision (Unanimous) || 3 || 3:00
|- style="background:#cfc;"
| 2017-04-01 || Win ||align=left| Sergio Cabezas|| Wu Lin Feng 2017: China VS Europe || Zhengzhou, China || Decision (Unanimous) || 3 || 3:00
|- style="background:#cfc;"
| 2017-03-04 || Win ||align=left| Kittachai|| Wu Lin Feng 2017: Kung Fu VS Muay Thai || Zhengzhou, China || TKO || 2 ||
|- style="background:#cfc;"
| 2017-02-10|| Win ||align=left| Thol Makara|| Wu Lin Feng 2017: Battle of the Golden Triangle || Bokeo Province, Laos ||  ||  ||
|- style="background:#fbb;"
| 2017-01-14 || Loss||align=left| Adrian Maxim || Wu Lin Feng World Championship 2017 63 kg Tournament Semi Finals|| Zhengzhou, China || Decision (Unanimous) || 3 || 3:00
|- style="background:#cfc;"
| 2017-01-14 || Win ||align=left| Joan Manuel Lique Cañaveral|| Wu Lin Feng World Championship 2017 63 kg Tournament Quarter Finals|| Zhengzhou, China || Decision (Unanimous) || 3 || 3:00
|- style="background:#cfc;"
| 2016-12-03 || Win ||align=left| Keisuke Nakamura|| Wu Lin Feng 2016: WLF x Krush - China vs Japan || Zhengzhou, China || Decision (Unanimous) || 3 || 3:00
|- style="background:#fbb;"
| 2016-11-17 || Loss||align=left| Joseph Gogo ||Wu Lin Feng 2016: China vs USA || Las Vegas, United States || Decision (Unanimous)|| 3 || 3:00
|-  style="background:#cfc;"
| 2016-11-05 || Win||align="left"| Petmorakot Adison || Wu Lin Feng 2016: Fight of the Century 2 || Nanjing, China || Decision (Unanimous)|| 3 || 3:00
|- style="background:#;"
| 2016-10-14 || ||align=left| Payanoi || Wu Lin Feng x KF1, -62 kg Intercontinental belt Final || Hong Kong ||  ||  ||
|- style="background:#cfc;"
| 2016-10-14 || Win ||align=left| Reda Narain|| Wu Lin Feng x KF1, -62 kg Intercontinental belt Semi Final || Hong Kong ||  ||  ||
|- style="background:#cfc;"
| 2016-10-01 || Win ||align=left| Jakkaphan Sompak|| Glory of Heroes 5 || Zhengzhou, China || TKO || 3 ||
|-  style="background:#CCFFCC;"
| 2016-09-03 || Win || align="left" | Ilias El Hajoui || Wu Lin Feng 2016: Netherlands VS China || Shenzhen, China || Decision || 3 || 3:00
|- style="background:#fbb;"
| 2016-08-27 || Loss ||align=left| Joey Concha|| Wu Lin Feng 2016: China vs Australia || Sydney, Australia || Decision (Split) || 3 || 3:00
|- style="background:#cfc;"
| 2016-07-15 || Win ||align=left| Vitaliy Volosovski|| Wu Lin Feng : Russia vs China || Zhengzhou, China || Decision (Unanimous) || 3 || 3:00

|- style="background:#cfc;"
| 2016-06-25 || Win ||align=left| Shunichi Shimizu|| Hua Wujue || China || KO||  ||

|- style="background:#cfc;"
| 2016-06-04 || Win ||align=left| Alexy Wallace|| Wu Lin Feng || Zhengzhou, China || Decision || 3 || 3:00
|- style="background:#cfc;"
| 2016-05-14 || Win||align=left| Kane Conlan || Wu Lin Feng : China vs New Zealand || Auckland, New Zealand || Decision  || 3 || 3:00
|- style="background:#cfc;"
| 2016-04-20 || Win||align=left| Yowan Kim || Wu Lin Feng : China vs Korea || China || Decision (Unanimous) || 3 || 3:00
|- style="background:#cfc;"
| 2016-04-09 || Win||align=left| Alexandros Vlachos || GODS OF WAR 8 x Wu Lin Feng : China vs Greece|| Athens, Greece || Decision (Unanimous) || 3 || 3:00
|-  style="background:#fbb;"
| 2016-03-05|| Loss ||align=left| Pakorn P.K. Saenchai Muaythaigym || Wu Lin Feng || Zhengzhou, China || Decision || 3 || 3.00
|- style="background:#cfc;"
| 2015-11-13 || Win ||align=left| Adam Rothweiler ||Wu Lin Feng 2015 - USA vs China || Las Vegas, United States || Decision (Unanimous)|| 3 || 3:00
|-  style="background:#fbb;"
| 2015-10-10 || Loss||align=left| Pedro Kol || Wu Lin Feng x Dynamite Fight Night 29 || Portugal || Decision|| 3 ||3:00  
|-
! style=background:white colspan=9 |
|- style="background:#cfc;"
| 2015-08-22 || Win ||align=left| Stanislav Maliev || Wu Lin Feng || Xiamen, China || KO ||  ||
|- style="background:#fbb;"
| 2015-08-01 || Loss ||align=left| Bohdan Kopkin || Wu Lin Feng || Zhengzhou, China || Decision || 3 || 3:00
|- style="background:#fbb;"
| 2015-07-04 || Loss ||align=left| Sergio Wielzen || Wu Lin Feng || China || KO || 2 ||
|- style="background:#cfc;"
| 2015-06-06 || Win ||align=left| Taison Maeguchi || Wu Lin Feng 2015 Battle of the Century || Jiyuan, China || Decision || 3 || 3:00
|- style="background:#c5d2ea;"
| 2015-04-12 || Draw||align=left| Masa Sato || WLF x FG - China vs Japan || Tokyo, Japan || Decision  || 3 || 3:00
|- style="background:#cfc;"
| 2015-03-07 || Win ||align=left| Rui Briceno || Wu Lin Feng || Zhengzhou, China || Decision (Unanimous) || 3 || 3:00
|- style="background:#cfc;"
| 2015-01-24 || Win||align=left| Kayasit ||  || Huizhou, China || Decision  || 3 || 3:00
|- style="background:#cfc;"
| 2015-01-03 || Win||align=left| Andrea Roberti || Kunlun Fight 15 || Nanjing, China || Decision  || 3 || 3:00
|- style="background:#fbb;"
| 2014-12-04 || Loss||align=left| Kim Jin-Hyeok || Kunlun Fight 14 || Bangkok, Thailand || Decision  || 3 || 3:00
|- style="background:#fbb;"
| 2014-10-19 || Loss||align=left| Subman || Heroes Global Kung Fu || Zhengzhou, China || Decision (Unanimous) || 3 || 3:00
|- style="background:#cfc;"
| 2014-08-31 || Win||align=left| Li Xiaomao || Kunlun Fight 9 || Shangqiu, China || Decision (Unanimous) || 3 || 3:00
|-
| colspan=9 | Legend:

See also
 List of male kickboxers

References 

Chinese male kickboxers
1997 births
Living people
Bantamweight kickboxers
Chinese sanshou practitioners
People from Yongjia County
Sportspeople from Wenzhou